John Patrick Douglas Balfour, 3rd Baron Kinross (25 June 1904 – 4 June 1976) was a Scottish historian and writer noted for his biography of Mustafa Kemal Atatürk and other works on Islamic history.

Early life

Balfour was born on 25 June 1904. He was the eldest son of Patrick Balfour, 2nd Baron Kinross and Caroline Elsie Johnstone-Douglas (1879–1969).

His paternal grandparents were the Lord Justice General John Balfour, 1st Baron Kinross and, his first wife, Lilias Oswald Mackenzie (a daughter of Donald Mackenzie, Lord Mackenzie). His maternal grandparents were Jane Maitland Hathorn-Stewart and Arthur Johnstone-Douglas, an member of the extended Marquess of Queensberry family.

He was educated at Winchester College and Balliol College, Oxford, where he was a member of the Railway Club. He then became a journalist and writer.

Career
A prominent historian, Lord Kinross was a writer noted for his biography of Mustafa Kemal Atatürk and other works on Islamic history.

During the Second World War he served with the Royal Air Force and from 1944 to 1947 was First Secretary at the British Embassy at Cairo.

Personal life

In 1938, he married Angela Mary Culme-Seymour (1912–2012), daughter of George Culme-Seymour and Janet (née Orr-Ewing) and former wife of the artist John Spencer-Churchill. Having been separated by World War II when Balfour was posted to Cairo, she started a five-year relationship with Major Robert Hewer-Hewitt by whom she had two sons, Mark and Johnny. Patrick and Angela were divorced in 1942.

Despite the brief marriage, Lord Kinross was homosexual; he had no issue and was succeeded by his brother David Andrew Balfour, 4th Baron Kinross.

He is buried in "Lords Row" in Dean Cemetery, Edinburgh with all previous ancestors of the title Baron Kinross.

In popular culture
In 1974 John Betjeman wrote the poem For Patrick: aetat LXX published in his A Nip in the Air, with a footnote giving Balfour's name and title.

Books 

Society Racket. A Critical Survey of Modern Social Life (1933)
The Ruthless Innocent (1949) Supposedly based on the character of Angela Culme-Seymour
The Orphaned Realm: Journeys in Cyprus (1951)
Within the Taurus: A Journey in Asiatic Turkey (1954)
Portrait of Greece with photographs in colour by Dimitri, Max Parrish: London (1956)Europa Minor: Journeys in Coastal Turkey (1956)The Kindred Spirit; a history of gin and of the House of Booth (London, 1959)The Innocents at Home [An account of the author's travels in the United States of America] (1959)Atatürk: The Rebirth of a Nation (London. 1964)Atatürk: A Biography of Mustafa Kemal, Father of Modern Turkey (New York. 1965)Portrait of Egypt (1966)The Windsor Years: The Life of Edward, as Prince of Wales, King, and Duke of Windsor (1967)Between Two Seas: The Creation of the Suez Canal (1968)Ottoman Centuries: The Rise and Fall of the Turkish Empire (1977) Hagia Sophia :A History of Constantinople''  (1979) Newsweek Book Division

References

External links

 National Portrait Gallery, NPG.org.uk. Accessed 30 November 2022.
 Profile, ThePeerage.com. Accessed 30 November 2022.

Balfour, John Patrick
Balfour, John Patrick
Barons in the Peerage of the United Kingdom
Balfour, John Patrick
Balfour, John Patrick
LGBT peers
Scottish gay writers
People educated at Winchester College
Alumni of Balliol College, Oxford
Royal Air Force personnel of World War II
British diplomats
20th-century British historians
Scottish biographers
British Islamic studies scholars
Scholars of Ottoman history
British travel writers
Kinross, Patrick, 3rd Baron
Burials at the Dean Cemetery
20th-century Scottish LGBT people